The Commendation for Distinguished Service is a military decoration awarded to personnel of the Australian Defence Force, it is awarded for the distinguished performance of duties in warlike operations. The Commendation for Distinguished Service was introduced in 1991 and replaced its Imperial equivalent, Mention in Despatches. It is the third level of distinguished service decoration in the Australian Honours System.

Description
 The insignia of the Commendation for Distinguished Service is a central Federation Star on a nickel-silver row of flames that taper at each end.
 The insignia is attached to an ochre-red ribbon.

See also
Australian Honours Order of Precedence
:Category:Recipients of the Commendation for Distinguished Service

References

External links
It's an Honour

Military awards and decorations of Australia
1991 establishments in Australia
Awards established in 1991